Helen Mary Wilson  (née Ostler; 4 May 1869 – 16 April 1957) was a New Zealand teacher, farmer, community leader and writer. She was born in Oamaru, New Zealand, in 1869.

Political life 
Wilson was active in the Women's Division of the Farmer's Union and one of the early Dominion presidents. She founded the Piopio branch of the organisation in 1927, and in the 1937 Coronation Honours, she was appointed an Officer of the Order of the British Empire, in recognition of her service as Dominion president of the Women's Division.

Interviewed for a radio program during the 1950s, Wilson recalled the process involved for women in New Zealand in obtaining the right to vote and also discussed the Married Women's Property Act.

Books 
Wilson was the author of several books, including the autobiography My First Eighty Years. This book is regarded as a New Zealand classic.

Personal life 
Wilson spent several years in the North Island town of Levin with her mother, prominent businesswoman and women's suffrage campaigner Emma Ostler. Helen Wilson married politician Charles Kendall Wilson on 16 May 1892. She lived for most of her adult life in Piopio in the Waitomo district of the North Island. She moved to Hamilton in 1942.

References

1869 births
1957 deaths
New Zealand autobiographers
New Zealand schoolteachers
People from Oamaru
Women autobiographers
20th-century New Zealand women writers
19th-century New Zealand women writers
19th-century New Zealand writers
20th-century New Zealand writers
New Zealand Officers of the Order of the British Empire